Markus William Redmond (born February 5, 1971) is an American actor, director, and screenwriter.

Career
In 2016, Redmond directed and starred in the independent film, The 6th Degree, a psychological thriller that he also wrote and co-produced. The cast included Redmond, Mackenzie Astin and Turkish actress Fadik Atasoy. The film was eventually released worldwide on Amazon Prime. 

In 2017, Redmond wrote and directed the comedy horror short film Allen + Millie: A Short Romance starring Scream Queen Brooke Lewis and Courtney Gains. The short garnered awards from such festivals as the Los Angeles Film Awards and the Sicily International Film Festival.

Screenwriting
In 2000, Redmond, along with Ivy Williams, sold the college thriller I Would Die for You to Columbia Pictures. The film was never made.

In 2007, Redmond wrote and starred in the independent film If I Had Known I Was a Genius. The cast included Whoopi Goldberg, Sharon Stone, Keith David, and Tara Reid. The film premiered January 23, 2007, at the Sundance Film Festival.

Acting
Redmond's films include the independent black ensemble film, The Inkwell (1994); K-11 (2012); Jeff Abugov's The Mating Habits of the Earthbound Human (1999); and the 2000 comedy, How to Kill Your Neighbor's Dog, alongside Kenneth Branagh and Robin Wright.

Redmond acted in two more television series, first in the recurring role of Officer Lucas on NYPD Blue (1993-1994), and then as Mark Washington in two season of Murder One (1995-1996).

In 1999, Redmond starred as series regular Phil on the sitcom Family Rules, starring Greg Evigan. His other television credits include 21 Jump Street (1990), Family Matters (1990), the 1995 revival series Get Smart (1995), Mad About You (1997), Vengeance Unlimited (1999), Angel (1999, 2000), and The Drew Carey Show (2003. (2005).[2]

Publishing
In 2012 Redmond published the erotic e-book, Poker Night.

Other media
Redmond has been a featured guest of Reddit Q&As and numerous entertainment podcasts.  Since 2015, Redmond has been a recurring interviewee on the YouTube filmmaking vlog channel, Film Courage.

Personal life
On August 2, 2008, Redmond married movie caterer Isis Heuser in Las Vegas.

Filmography

Film

Television

Awards and nominations

References

External links

Markus Redmond on Redditt
Markus Redmond on Instagram
Markus Redmond on Twitter
Markus Redmond: How I Wrote My First Script In 3 Weeks And Sold It To A Hollywood Studio (2015), Film Courage on YouTube
Murphy, Keith, "From ‘Dawson’s Creek’ to ‘Buffy’ to ‘Frasier’ to ‘Seinfeld’ — what happened to those lone, ‘token’ black actors?", andscape.com, Feb 26, 2018.
"10 QUESTIONS WITH…..MARKUS REDMOND", from the blog As I was Saying..., Sep 13, 2013.
The 6th Degree on Amazon Prime
Allen + Millie: A Short Romance on Amazon Prime

1971 births
Living people
American film directors
American film producers
American screenwriters
People from Philadelphia
African-American film directors
African-American screenwriters
American male film actors
African-American film producers
Screenwriters from Pennsylvania
Male actors from Philadelphia
Film producers from California
21st-century American male actors
Male actors from Los Angeles
21st-century African-American people
20th-century African-American people